Ludab District is a district (bakhsh) in Boyer-Ahmad County, Kohgiluyeh and Boyer-Ahmad Province, Iran. At the 2006 census, its population was 14,687, in 2,896 families.  The District has one city: Garab-e Sofla. The District has two rural districts (dehestan): Chin Rural District and Ludab Rural District.

References 

Districts of Kohgiluyeh and Boyer-Ahmad Province
Boyer-Ahmad County